The Rising  may refer to:

Events

 The Easter Rising or Easter Rebellion, the April 1916 republican uprising against British rule in Ireland

Memorials
 The Rising (9/11 memorial), a 2006 memorial in Westchester County, New York for the victims of the September 11 attacks

Music
 The Rising (album), a 2002 album by Bruce Springsteen
 "The Rising" (Bruce Springsteen song), the title song from the above album
 "The Rising" (Trivium song), a 2006 song by the band Trivium
 The Rising (band), an American band fronted by Michael Johns
 The Rising (Tigerstyle album), the 2000 debut album by Tigerstyle

Literature
 The Rising (Keene novel), a book by Brian Keene concerning zombie uprisings
 The Rising (LaHaye novel), a book by Tim LaHaye and Jerry B. Jenkins in the Left Behind series
 The Rising (Stirling novel), the first of the Flight Engineer by S. M. Stirling and James Doohan

Television and film
 Mangal Pandey: The Rising, a 2005 Indian film
 "The Rising", an episode of the TV series John Doe
 The Rising (2016 film), an Irish film
 "The Rising" (MacGyver), the series premiere of the 2016 television series MacGyver
 The Rising (TV series), a 2022 British TV series

See also
 Rising (disambiguation)